Slizovitsa is a rural locality (a village) in Teplogorskoye Rural Settlement, Velikoustyugsky District, Vologda Oblast, Russia. The population was 30 as of 2002.

Geography 
Slizovitsa is located 73 km southeast of Veliky Ustyug (the district's administrative centre) by road. Votchevo is the nearest rural locality.

References 

Rural localities in Velikoustyugsky District